College Hockey South (CHS), formerly known as the South Eastern Collegiate Hockey Conference (SECHC), is a non-varsity ice hockey conference in the Southern United States.  The conference plays in Division 2 and Division 3 of the Collegiate Hockey Federation (CHF).  The member clubs of College Hockey South are member universities of several different conferences  in NCAA athletics. 

On February 11, 2022, the South Eastern Collegiate Hockey Conference rebranded as College Hockey South.

Teams
After the 2012–13 season Arkansas moved from the South Region of Division 3 to the Pacific Region but remained a member of the ACHA.

Following the 2014–15 season, both Arkansas and Alabama moved up to ACHA Division 1. Alabama discontinued their participation in the SECHC in 2015, but returned to the conference in 2021.

On January 2, 2023, College Hockey South announced the addition of a women's division beginning in the 2023-2024 season. The division will consist of women's teams from Auburn, Miami, South Florida, and Tampa as well as the teams of Georgia and South Carolina which are both currently being formalized.

Men's Division II

Men's Division III

Former members

Membership timeline

Conference champions
The CHS Championship Tournament is held every year in February at the conclusion of the regular season and after the ACHA South Regionals. After the 2014–15 season the cross-divisional playoff format was abandoned. For the 2015–16 season there was just one division within CHS and the first round of the playoffs featured the #1 seed vs the #8 seed, the #2 seed vs the #7 seed, etc.

Venues
Venues for the teams vary from community ice rinks to civic-center sized arenas.  As the conference has expanded and interest in hockey has grown in the Southern United States teams have sought larger venues for games.  The 2010-11 SECHC Championship Tournament was held at the 8,500 seat Columbus Civic Center.  Two teams, Georgia and Florida along with in-state rivals Georgia Tech and Florida State, as well as a Thursday game played between in-state rivals South Carolina and Citadel play a yearly tournament at the Savannah Civic Center.

ACHA Division 3 Nationals teams
CHS has sent 13 teams to the ACHA Division 3 National Tournament. While no CHS team has ever made it out of pool play, Arkansas in 2014 had the best success going 2-1 in their pool but losing the goals against tie breaker to the eventual champion Adrian College.

2009 Host City: Rochester, NY
Tennessee (Finished 11th)
Hope College (L 3-5)
Colorado (W 7-6)
Dordt College (L 1-4)
Albany (W 6-5)

2010 Host City: Fort Myers, FL
Florida (Finished 12th)
College of the Canyons (L 3-8)
Saginaw Valley State (L 1-14)
Robert Morris (W 8-6)
Arkansas (Finished 13th)
Colorado (L 1-7)
Hope College (L 2-5)
Fredonia State (L 2-4)

2012 Host City: Vineland, NJ
Alabama (Finished 16th)
California (PA) (L 3-7)
Hope College (L 1-9)
Cal State Northridge (L 6-7 OT)

2013 Host City: Springfield, MO
Mississippi (Finished 13th)
Colorado State (W 2-1)
Farmingdale State (L 2-5)
Adrian College (L 0-9)
Alabama (Finished 14th)
Iowa State (W 4-2)
California (PA) (L 5-7)
Michigan-Flint (L 1-7)

2014 Host City: Coral Springs, FL
Arkansas (Finished 7th)
Adrian College (L 3-4)
Neumann (W 14-6)
Central Florida (W 6-2)
Mississippi (Finished 15th)
California (PA) (L 2-8)
Davenport (L 2-10)
Aurora (L 3-9)

2015 Host City: Pelham, AL
Arkansas (Finished 8th)
Fairfield (W 6-2)
Calvin College (W 9-2)
Florida Gulf Coast (L 1-6)
Alabama (Finished 9th)
Michigan State (T 4-4)
Pittsburgh-Johnstown (W 6-1)
Colorado State, (L 6-7 OT)
Mississippi (Finished 15th)
Oakland (L 4-7)
California (PA) (L 3-7)
Metro State (L 1-6)

2017 Host City: Columbus, OH
Georgia (Finished 11th)
Oakland (L 6-7)
Bryn Athyn (L 1-6)
Missouri State (W 7-3)

2018 Host City: Columbus, OH
Georgia (Finished 11th)
Nebraska (W 5-1)
Oakland (L 4-8)
Farmingdale State (L 7-3)

See also
American Collegiate Hockey Association
List of ice hockey leagues

References

External links
CHS official website

ACHA Division 3 conferences
2008 establishments in the United States